Cryo- is from the Ancient Greek κρύος (krúos, “ice, icy cold, chill, frost”).  Uses of the prefix Cryo- include:

Physics and geology
 Cryogenics, the study of the production and behaviour of materials at very low temperatures and the study of producing extremely low temperatures 
 Cryoelectronics, the study of superconductivity under cryogenic conditions and its applications 
 Cryosphere, those portions of Earth's surface where water ice naturally occurs
 Cryotron, a switch that uses superconductivity
 Cryovolcano, a theoretical type of volcano that erupts volatiles instead of molten rock

Biology and medicine
 Cryobiology, the branch of biology that studies the effects of low temperatures on living things
 Cryonics, the low-temperature preservation of people who cannot be sustained by contemporary medicine
 Cryoprecipitate, a blood-derived protein product used to treat some bleeding disorders
 Cryotherapy, medical treatment using cold
 Cryoablation, tissue removal using cold
 Cryosurgery, surgery using cold
 Cryo-electron microscopy (cryoEM), a technique that fires beams of electrons at proteins that have been frozen in solution, to deduce the biomolecules’ structure

Other uses
 Cryo Interactive, a video game company
 Cryos, a planet in the video game Darkspore

See also

 Kryo, a brand of CPUs by Qualcomm

External links

Cryogenics
Cryobiology
Cryonics
Superconductivity